John MacDonald (born 27 May 1936) is a racing car driver and a motor-cycle racer of Hong Kong. He was originally from England, where he started his career racing motorcycles, then cars until he served at the National service. He then lived in Hong Kong and raced as a competitor of Hong Kong, where he owned a garage business. He is best known as the most successful driver in the Macau Grand Prix during the early 1970s.

He is the only person to have won all the international races of Macau; Macau Grand Prix (1965, 1972, 1973 and 1975), Macau Motorcycle Grand Prix (1969) and Guia Race (1972). He is also the winner of the most Macau Grand Prix competitions, with 4 wins, and the first winner of the Guia Race in 1972.

In addition to his Macau victories, MacDonald won the Malaysian Grand Prix four times. He also won the 1976 Indonesian Grand Prix.

References

1936 births
British emigrants to Hong Kong
English motorcycle racers
English racing drivers
Hong Kong racing drivers
Living people
Hong Kong people of British descent
Sportspeople from Worcester, England